The Bréguet 26T was a French single-engine biplane airliner that first flew in 1926.

Development
The 26T was an attempt by the Breguet company to find a civil market for their 19 military aircraft by mating its wings, tail surfaces and undercarriage to a new fuselage and new engine. The resulting aircraft could carry six passengers in an enclosed cabin, while the pilots sat in an open cockpit ahead of the upper wing. The engine originally chosen was a French-built licensed copy of the Bristol Jupiter radial, but on one of the two Bréguet-built civil examples, this was later changed back to the Lorraine 12Ed inline, as used on the Br.19.

These two aircraft served as predecessors for the definitive civil version of this family, the Breguet 280T, while CASA purchased a licence to build another two in Spain for the domestic market, and France's Aviation Militaire purchased two more as air ambulances under the designation Bre.26TSbis.

Operational history
The first prototype was briefly used by Air Union for trial flights on the Paris-Lyons–Marseilles route, but did not enter commercial service. At least one of the CASA-built aircraft was used the Spanish airline Compañía de Líneas Aéreas Subvencionadas (CLASSA) and later by CLASSA's successor airline, Líneas Aéreas Postales Españolas LAPE.

Operators

French Air Force
 Kingdom of Spain &  Spanish Republic
Aeronáutica Militar, later in service in the Fuerzas Aéreas de la República Española.

Specifications (26T)

See also

References

Notes

Bibliography
 
 
 
 aviafrance.com

1920s French airliners
 0026T
Single-engined tractor aircraft
Biplanes